Baranowice may refer to the following places:
Baranowice, Góra County in Lower Silesian Voivodeship (south-west Poland)
Baranowice, Milicz County in Lower Silesian Voivodeship (south-west Poland)
Baranowice, Wrocław County in Lower Silesian Voivodeship (south-west Poland)
Baranowice, Lubusz Voivodeship (west Poland)
Baranowice (Żory) in Silesian Voivodeship (south Poland)
 Baranowicze, the Polish name of Baranovichi, a city in the Brest Province of western Belarus